71st ACE Eddie Awards
April 17, 2021

Feature Film (Dramatic): 
The Trial of the Chicago 7 

Feature Film (Comedy or Musical): 
Palm Springs

The 71st American Cinema Editors Eddie Awards were presented on April 17, 2021, virtually, honoring the best editors in films and television. The nominees were announced on March 11, 2021.

Winners and nominees
Winners are listed first, highlighted in boldface

Film
Best Edited Feature Film – Dramatic
 Alan Baumgarten – The Trial of the Chicago 7
 Kirk Baxter – Mank
 Harry Yoon – Minari
 Chloé Zhao – Nomadland
 Mikkel E. G. Nielsen – Sound of Metal

Best Edited Feature Film – Comedy or Musical
 Matthew Friedman and Andrew Dickler – Palm Springs
 James Thomas, Craig Alpert, and Mike Giambra – Borat Subsequent Moviefilm
 Mark Eckersley – I Care a Lot
 Sarah Flack – On the Rocks
 Frédéric Thoraval – Promising Young Woman

Best Edited Animated Feature Film
 Kevin Nolting – Soul
 James Ryan – The Croods: A New Age
 Catherine Apple – Onward
 Edie Ichioka – Over the Moon
 Darragh Byrne, Richie Cody, and Darren Holmes – Wolfwalkers

Best Edited Documentary (Feature)
 Pippa Ehrlich and Dan Schwalm – My Octopus Teacher
 Nancy Novack – All In: The Fight for Democracy
 Nels Bangerter – Dick Johnson Is Dead
 Scott D. Hanson, James Leche, Wyatt Rogowski, and Avner Shiloah – The Dissident
 Davis Coombe – The Social Dilemma

Best Edited Documentary (Non-Theatrical)
 Chad Beck, Devin Concannon, Abhay Sofsky, and Ben Sozanski – The Last Dance (Episode: "Episode I")
 Jeff Buchanan and Zoe Schack – Beastie Boys Story
 Derek Boonstra and Robert A. Martinez – The Bee Gees: How Can You Mend a Broken Heart
 Inbal B. Lessner, Alex Jablonski, Gillian McCarthy, Matthew Moul, and Chris A. Peterson – Seduced: Inside the NXIVM Cult (Episode: "Exposed")

Television
Best Edited Comedy Series for Commercial Television
 Trevor Ambrose – Schitt's Creek (Episode: "Happy Ending")
 Eric Kissack – The Good Place (Episode: "Whenever You're Ready")
 Dane McMaster, Varun Viswanath – What We Do in the Shadows (Episode: "On the Run")
 Yana Gorskaya, Dane McMaster – What We Do in the Shadows (Episode: "Resurrection")

Best Edited Comedy Series for Non-Commercial Television
 Melissa McCoy – Ted Lasso (Episode: "Make Rebecca Great Again")
 Tim Roche – Curb Your Enthusiasm (Episode: "Happy New Year")
 Nena Erb – Insecure (Episode: "Lowkey Trying")
 A.J. Catoline – Ted Lasso (Episode: "The Hope That Kills You")

Best Edited Drama Series for Commercial Television
 Joey Liew, Chris McCaleb – Better Call Saul (Episode: "Bad Choice Road")
 Dan Crinnion – Killing Eve (Episode: "Still Got It")
 Rosanne Tan – Mr. Robot (Episode: "405 Method Not Allowed")
 Julia Grove, Lai-San Ho – This Is Us (Episode: "Forty: Part Two")

Best Edited Drama Series for Non-Commercial Television
 Cindy Mollo – Ozark (Episode: "Wartime")
 Steven Cohen – Bosch (Episode: "The Ace Hotel")
 Julio C. Perez IV – Euphoria (Episode: "Trouble Don't Last Always")
 Dana E. Glauberman – The Mandalorian (Episode: "Chapter 4: Sanctuary")

Best Edited Miniseries or Motion Picture for Television
 Michelle Tesoro – The Queen's Gambit (Episode: "Exchanges")
 Jonah Moran – Hamilton
 Robert Komatsu – Mrs. America (Episode: "Phyllis")
 Anna Hauger – Watchmen (Episode: "This Extraordinary Being")

Best Edited Non-Scripted Series
 Kate Hackett, Daniel McDonald, Mark Morgan, Sharon Weaver, Ted Woerner – Cheer (Episode: God Blessed Texas")
 Barry Blaschke, Michelle Brundige, Charles Divak, Jane Jo, Benji Kast, Stefanie Maridueña, Seth Skundrick, Evan Wise – The Circus: Inside the Greatest Political Show on Earth (Episode: "Who the F*** Are We?")
 Rob Butler, Isaiah Camp, Joe Mikan, Art O’Leary, Ian Olsen, Josh Stockero – Deadliest Catch (Episode: "Mayday Mayday")
 Adam Locke-Norton – How To with John Wilson (Episode: "How to Cook the Perfect Risotto")

Best Edited Variety Talk/Sketch Show or Special
  Adam Gough – David Byrne's American Utopia
 Steven Bognar – 8:46
 Jon Alloway, Chester G Contaoi, Brian Forbes, Brad Gilson, Pi Ware – Dave Chappelle: The Kennedy Center Mark Twain Prize for American Humor
 Paul Del Gesso, Yanni Feder, Daniel Garcia, Jack Klink, Richard Lampasone, Ryan McIlraith, Sean McIlraith, Steven Pierce, Christopher Salerno, Devon Schwab, Ryan Spears, Jason Watkins – Saturday Night Live (Episode: "Tom Hanks")

Best Edited Animation (Non-Theatrical)
 Lee Harting – Rick and Morty (Episode: "Rattlestar Ricklactica")
 Felipe Salazar – Big Mouth (Episode: "Nick Starr")
 Jeremy Reuben – Bob's Burgers (Episode: "Bob Belcher and the Terrible, Horrible, No Good, Very Bad Kids")
  Brian Swanson – BoJack Horseman (Episode: "Nice While It Lasted")

References

External links

71
2020 film awards
2020 in American cinema